Dreams of Gold: The Mel Fisher Story is a 1986 American made-for-television drama film starring Cliff Robertson and Loretta Swit. It is based on the actual adventures of Treasure Hunter Mel Fisher and premiered on CBS on November 15, 1986.

Background
The role of Fisher was played by Cliff Robertson and his wife Deo was played by Loretta Swit. The story centers around Fisher's hunt for the Atocha treasure,<ref>Florida in the Popular Imagination: Essays on the Cultural Landscape of the Sunshine State, Steve Glassman - Page 214</ref> and Fisher's 17 obsession-driven year search for the galleon Nuestra Señora de Atocha that vanished in 1622 while being caught off the coast of Florida. It also looks at Fisher's obsession and the effect it had on his family, and the courts that were trying to shut him down.

During the making of the movie, Cliff Robertson was approached by Mel Fisher himself, telling him he had a map and they would meet again. Both Robertson are pictured in George Walter Born's Historic Florida Keys: An Illustrated History of Key West & the Keys, with Robertson holding a small treasure chest of silver coins and a gold chain.

Deo Fisher mentioned one inaccuracy in the film. Her character played by Loretta Swit was cooking in the film and she commented that everyone that knew her knows she didn't cook.

Technical and other
The film's production company was Inter Planetary Productions. It was released on November 15, 1986. The DVD was released on February 10, 1998.

VHS releases
 Goldhill Home Media - November 21, 2000 –  87 minutes
 BWE Video, January 1, 2000 - Part of a set of four VHS tapes, with a total running time 371 MinutesVol 1: Dreams of Gold, Narrated by Cliff Robertson and Loretta Switt.Vol II: Gold Rush on Mount Diwata (Part 1&2); The Sunken Peacock Throne; and The Treasure Ships of the Bass Straight.Vol III: Treasure of the Kronan; The Ghost Fleet of Vigo;and Secrets of the Cocos Island.Vol IV: Yamashita's Gold; The Emerald King of Rio Minero; and The Last Voyage of Captain Kidd''.

DVD releases
 The Simitar, 7278 release runs for 87 minutes and is in monophonic sound format.

Soundtrack
Songs featured in the movie 
 The Ebonites Steel Orchestra - "Blue Nose"
 The Ebonites Steel Orchestra - "True Love"
 Kevin McKnelly and Don Sterling  - "She's On My Mind"
 Saloon - "Dreams Of Gold"
 Saloon - Ridin' The Wind"
 Saloon - Never Gonna Go Back There Again"
 Saloon - Doin' The Best That You Can"

Cast

References

External links
 

1986 television films
1986 films
1986 drama films
1980s English-language films
CBS network films
Films directed by James Goldstone
Films scored by Ernest Gold
American drama television films
1980s American films